
Łuków County is a unit of territorial administration and local government (powiat) in Lublin Voivodeship, eastern Poland. It was established on January 1, 1999, as a result of the Polish local government reforms passed in 1998.

As of 2019, its total population is 107,144, including 29,885, in Łuków, 2.520in Stoczek Łukowski, and a rural population is 74.739.

Łuków County in the past
Lukow Land (Polish: ziemia lukowska, Latin: Terra Lucoviensis, Districtus Lucoviensis) or Lukow County was an administrative unit (ziemia) of both the Kingdom of Poland and the Polish–Lithuanian Commonwealth. With seat in the town of Lukow, it was located in extreme northeastern corner of Lesser Poland, and until 1474 belonged to Sandomierz Voivodeship. From 1474 to 1795, Lukow Land was part of Lublin Voivodeship. Its total area was 1928 km2.

Lukow Land bordered Lesser Polands’ Lublin County in the south, Lesser Polands’ Stężyca Land in the southwest, Mazovian Czersk Land in the west, Mazovian Liw Land in northwest, Drohiczyn Land (part of Podlasie) in the north and Brzesc Litewski County (part of Grand Duchy of Lithuania) in the east.

In early years of Polish statehood, Lukow Land belonged to the Province (Land) of Sandomierz, which later became Sandomierz Voivodeship. In 1474, when Lublin Voivodeship was carved out of Sandomierz Voivodeship, Lukow Land became part of this new administrative unit.

Historic town of Lukow was the capital of the land, and the seat of the starosta. Currently, there are only four towns in the territory of this former administrative unit. Apart from Lukow, these are Siedlce, Radzyn Podlaski and Kock. Also, the villages of Serokomla, Tuchowicz and Zbuczyn had town status.

After the Partitions of Poland, Lukow Land was annexed by the Habsburg Empire as part of New Galicia (1795). In 1809, it was annexed into the Duchy of Warsaw, and in 1815 – 1916, it was part of Russian-controlled Congress Poland. Due to numerous administrative changes in this corner of historic Lesser Poland lost its ties with the rest of the province, and in the 19th century became called Southern Podlasie. In the Second Polish Republic, former Lukow Land belonged to Lublin Voivodeship. Currently, it is divided between Lublin Voivodeship (Lukow) and Mazovian Voivodeship (Siedlce).

Neighbouring counties
Łuków County is bordered by Siedlce County to the north, Biała Podlaska County to the east, Radzyń Podlaski County to the south-east, Lubartów County to the south, Ryki County to the south-west and Garwolin County to the west.

Administrative division
The county is subdivided into 11 gminas (two urban and nine rural). These are listed in the following table, in descending order of population.

References

 
Land counties of Lublin Voivodeship
Ziemias